Larry Smith may refer to:

Entertainment
Larry Smith (puppeteer) (1938–2018), producer of children's programming and creator of the Larry Smith Puppets troupe
Larry R. Smith (born 1943), American professor, novelist, poet
Larry Smith (musician) (born 1944), British drummer
Larry E. Smith (born 1945), Canadian musician, composer, recording artist
Larry Smith (producer) (1952–2014), American record producer
Larry Smith (editor) (born 1968), editor of Smith Magazine and co-author of Six Word Memoirs
Larry Smith (cinematographer), British cinematographer
Larry Smith, fictional parent character in Wee Sing: The Best Christmas Ever!

Politics
Larry G. Smith (1914–1992), member of the Ohio House of Representatives
Larry Smith (trade unionist) (1923–2005), British trade union leader
Larry Smith (Canadian politician) (born 1951), Canadian Senator, Canadian football player, president of the Montreal Alouettes

Sports
Larry Smith (American football coach) (1939–2008), college football coach
Larry H. Smith (1939–2002), US National hockey player and University of Minnesota standout
Larry Smith (racing driver) (1942–1973), 1972 Winston Cup Grand National Series Rookie of The Year
Larry Smith (running back) (born 1947), American football running back
Larry Smith (basketball, born 1958) (born 1958), professional basketball player
Larry Smith (basketball, born 1968), high school and college basketball player
Larry Smith (defensive tackle) (born 1974), American football defensive back

Other
14598 Larrysmith (1998 SU60), a main belt asteroid

See also
Lawrence Smith (disambiguation)
Lauren Smith (disambiguation)
Laurie Smith (born 1952), sheriff
Lawrie Smith (born 1956), British sailor
Lars Smith (1836–1913), Swedish politician
Larry Smyth (1902–1960), American journalist and public official